The 2014 Blue Jeans Go Green 200 presented by Cotton, The Fabric of Our Lives was the second stock car race of the 2014 NASCAR Nationwide Series season, and the 10th iteration of the event. The race was held on Saturday, March 1, 2014, in Avondale, Arizona at Phoenix International Raceway, a 1-mile (1.6 km) permanent low-banked tri-oval race track. The race was shortened from its scheduled 200 laps to 168 due to inclement weather. At race's end, Kyle Busch, driving for Joe Gibbs Racing, would dominate the race to win his 64th career NASCAR Nationwide Series win and his first of the season. To fill out the podium, Kevin Harvick, driving for JR Motorsports, and Brad Keselowski, driving for Team Penske, would finish second and third, respectively.

Background 

Phoenix International Raceway – also known as PIR – is a one-mile, low-banked tri-oval race track located in Avondale, Arizona. It is named after the nearby metropolitan area of Phoenix. The motorsport track opened in 1964 and currently hosts two NASCAR race weekends annually. PIR has also hosted the IndyCar Series, CART, USAC and the Rolex Sports Car Series. The raceway is currently owned and operated by International Speedway Corporation.

The raceway was originally constructed with a 2.5 mi (4.0 km) road course that ran both inside and outside of the main tri-oval. In 1991 the track was reconfigured with the current 1.51 mi (2.43 km) interior layout. PIR has an estimated grandstand seating capacity of around 67,000. Lights were installed around the track in 2004 following the addition of a second annual NASCAR race weekend.

Entry list 

 (R) denotes rookie driver.
 (i) denotes driver who is ineligible for series driver points.

Practice

First practice 
The first practice session was held on Friday, February 28, at 11:00 AM MST. The session would last for 50 minutes.

Second and final practice 
The final practice session, sometimes known as Happy Hour, was held on Friday, February 28, at 3:00 PM MST. The session would last for one hour and 25 minutes.

Qualifying 
Qualifying was held on Saturday, March 1, at 10:10 AM MST. Since Phoenix International Raceway is under  in length, the qualifying system was a multi-car system that included two rounds. The first round was 30 minutes, where every driver would be able to set a lap within the 30 minutes. Then, the second round would consist of the fastest 12 drivers in round 1, and drivers would have 10 minutes to set a time. Whoever set the fastest time in round 2 would win the pole.

Full qualifying results 

*Time unavailable.

Race results

Standings after the race 

Drivers' Championship standings

Note: Only the first 10 positions are included for the driver standings.

References 

2014 NASCAR Nationwide Series
NASCAR races at Phoenix Raceway
March 2014 sports events in the United States
2014 in sports in Arizona